The Good Cop is an Israeli police television sitcom that premiered on yes. The series was created by Erez Aviram and Tomer Aviram and produced by Yoav Gross, and is the first Israeli police sitcom. The 15-part series premiered its first episode on the Yes Comedy channel in Israel on August 15, 2015. The second season of the series was broadcast on April 4, 2017 and ended on July 12, 2017. It was announced that the third season was approved.

Netflix acquired the Israeli series and in September 2018 gave a 10-episode, straight-to-series order for a U.S. remake by Andy Breckman, starring Tony Danza and Josh Groban.

Premise 
After years of living together, police officer Danny Confino comes home to discover his girlfriend is cheating on him. Shocked by the discovery, Danny decides to leave her and her young son, whom he loves and raises as his own.  As a police salary won't allow him to rent his own apartment, Danny returns to his parents' house – temporarily. What starts out as a provisional arrangement soon becomes permanent as Danny discovers that life back at home surpasses any crime scene. Despite his unconventional and sometimes violent behavior, Danny is perceived as a "a man's man", a popular cop at the precinct he unofficially runs, but at home, with his exasperating parents and criminal brothers, he faces many more serious challenges. His hands tied, his authority limited, he slowly comes to find that his greedy and petty family are the real "criminals" and the main obstacles in his life.

Episodes

Summary

Season 1

Season 2

Cast and characters

Main 
 First Sergeant Danny Konfino (Yuval Semo): After discovering that his girlfriend is cheating on him, Danny, a cranky 40-year-old police officer, decides to move back in with his parents. In the second season, Danny is faced with a romantic dilemma.
 Yona Konfino: Danny's kindhearted mother. She has had enough of Izhar, Danny's cheap father, and their constant quarreling.
 Commander Jacob 'Rabi' (Guy Loel): The commander of the Petach Tikva police precinct for the last ten years, is a little selfish and known for his tendency to pamper himself with a variety of body lotions.
 Sergeant Dubi Azaria: Danny's friend, and a veteran cop who is lazy and fat. Robbed a bank at the end of the season because he needed money to raise his new baby. He was almost taken into custody but saved by Danny.
 Razi: An Israeli-Arab police officer.
 Izhar (Moshe Ivgy): Danny's father.
 Korin (Ortal Ben-Shoshan).
 Reuven, Danny's psychologist (Gilad Kleter).

References

External links 

2015 Israeli television series debuts
Israeli television shows
Yes (Israel) original programming
2010s police comedy television series
Good Cop